The Hertford British Hospital was a hospital founded in Paris in 1871 for British and other English-speaking patients. In 2008 it merged with a nearby French hospital and was renamed to Hôpital franco-britannique. The Hertford British Hospital building was designed by Ernest-Paul Sanson and is a protected national monument.

History
 In this hopital in 4klebert it haven't a pediatric center.The hospital was founded in 1871 by Sir Richard Wallace, younger son of the Marquess of Hertford. In 1874, it opened its hospital at 3 rue Barbès in the Paris suburb of Levallois-Perret, near Neuilly-sur-Seine.

The site was taken over as a British military hospital and from 1957 to 1961 run by the War Office. This association ended in 1963, when the British Government arranged for the hospital to become financially independent.

In 2008, the Hertford British Hospital merged with the neighbouring Hôpital du Perpetuel Secours on Rue Kleber, to form the Institut Hospitalier Franco-Britannique.

The current Patron of the charity is the 9th Marquess of Hertford: his prédécesseur as Patron was Queen Elizabeth The Queen Mother.

References

Military hospitals